Echola is an unincorporated community in Tuscaloosa County, Alabama, United States. Echola has a post office with ZIP code 35457. Echola was previously known as Elbert. Due to possible confusion with Elberta, Alabama, the postmaster, Golden Mayfield, created the name Echola by combining "echo" and "Alabama".

References

Unincorporated communities in Tuscaloosa County, Alabama
Unincorporated communities in Alabama